The Perai River is a major river in Penang, Malaysia. It also acts as the mother river of Butterworth, and it separates Perai and the Seberang Jaya suburb.

See also
 List of rivers of Malaysia

References

Rivers of Penang